Events from the year 1528 in France

Incumbents
 Monarch – Francis I

Events
 19 June – Battle of Landriano: A French army in Italy under Marshal Francis de Bourbon, Count of St. Pol is decisively defeated.
 12 September – Andrea Doria defeats his former allies, the French, and establishes the independence of Genoa.
 Chateau Fontainebleau in France is begun.

Births
 Jean-Jacques Boissard, French antiquary and Latin poet (d. 1602)
 probable
 Paul de Foix French diplomat

Deaths
 15 August – Odet de Foix, Vicomte de Lautrec, French military leader (b. 1485)

See also

References

1520s in France